Jodice is a surname. Notable people with the surname include:

James Jodice, American engineer
Mimmo Jodice (born 1934), Italian photographer
Ralph Jodice (born 1955), US Air Force general

See also
Jodie